Chamaenerion angustifolium is a perennial herbaceous flowering plant in the willowherb family Onagraceae. It is known in North America as fireweed, in some parts of Canada as great willowherb, in Britain and Ireland as rosebay willowherb. In the United Kingdom it is also known as bombweed, as a result of its rapid appearance on city bomb sites during the Blitz of World War II; the plant is also traditionally known as Saint Anthony's laurel. It is also known by the synonyms Chamerion angustifolium and Epilobium angustifolium. It is native throughout the temperate Northern Hemisphere, including large parts of the boreal forests.

Description

The leaves are spirally arranged, entire, narrowly lanceolate, and pinnately veined, the secondary leaf veins anastomosing, joining together to form a continuous marginal vein just inside the leaf margins.

The inflorescence is a symmetrical terminal raceme that blooms progressively from bottom to top, producing a gracefully tapered shape. The protruding style has four stigmas. The floral formula is ✶/↓ K4 C4 A4+4 or 4+0 Ğ(4).

The upright, reddish-brown linear seed capsule splits from the apex and curls open. It bears many minute brown seeds, about 300 to 400 per capsule and 80,000 per plant. The seeds have silky hairs to aid wind dispersal and are very easily spread by the wind, often becoming a weed and a dominant species on disturbed ground. Once established, the plants also spread extensively by underground roots, an individual plant eventually forming a large patch.

This species has been placed in the genus Chamaenerion (sometimes given as Chamerion) rather than Epilobium based on several morphological distinctions: spiral (rather than opposite or whorled) leaf arrangement; absence (rather than presence) of a hypanthium; subequal stamens (rather than stamens in two unequal whorls); zygomorphic (rather than actinomorphic)  stamens and stigma. Under this taxonomic arrangement, Chamaenerion and Epilobium are monophyletic sister genera.

Taxonomy 
Two subspecies are recognized as valid:
 Chamaenerion angustifolium subsp. angustifolium
 Chamaenerion angustifolium subsp. circumvagum (Mosquin) Hoch

Etymology 
The generic name Chamaenerion means 'dwarf-oleander' and the Latin specific epithet angustifolium translates as 'narrow-leaved'. It shares this epithet with many other species of plants, including Vaccinium angustifolium. The common British name "rosebay", from the passing resemblance of the flowers to (wild) roses and the leaves to those of bay, goes back in print to Gerard's Herball of 1597. The common American name "fireweed" derives from the species' abundance as a colonizer on burnt sites after forest fires and other disturbances.

Ecology 

Fireweed is often abundant in wet calcareous to slightly acidic soils in open fields, pastures, and particularly burned-over lands. It is a pioneer species that quickly colonizes open areas with little competition, such as the sites of forest fires and forest clearings. Plants grow and flower as long as there is open space and plenty of light. Fireweed reaches its average peak colonization after five years and then begins to be replaced as trees and brush grow larger. Seeds remain viable in the soil seed bank for many years. When a new fire or other disturbance occurs that opens up the ground to light again, the seeds germinate. Some areas with heavy seed counts in the soil can, after burning, be covered with pure dense stands of this species and when in flower the landscape is turned into fields of color.

Fireweed is an effective colonizer; it may not be present until after a fire has moved through a landscape. Because of its very high dispersal capacity, "propagule pressure" from its regional presence will let it quickly colonize a disturbed area.  Once seedlings are established, the plant quickly reproduces and covers the disturbed area via seeds and rhizomes. It is somewhat adapted to fire as well and so can prevent the reintroduction of fire to the landscape. Fireweed is well adapted to seed in severely burned areas as well, because the mineral soil that is exposed due to the removal of organic soil layers provides a good seedbed.

In Britain the plant was considered a rare species in the 18th century, and one confined to a few locations with damp, gravelly soils. It was misidentified as great hairy willowherb in contemporary floras. The plant's rise from local rarity to widespread abundance seems to have occurred at the same time as the expansion of the railway network and the associated soil disturbance. The plant became locally known as bombweed due to its rapid colonization of bomb craters in the Second World War.

Bears and elk are known to favor the plant as food.

Pollination
The flowers are visited by a wide variety of insects (the generalised pollination syndrome). Some species in the insect order Lepidoptera frequently use the willowherb as their primary larval host-plant, examples including the elephant hawk moth (Deilephila elpenor), bedstraw hawk moth (Hyles gallii), and the white-lined sphinx moth (Hyles lineata).

Uses

The plant is not considered palatable, but is easy to find. The very young shoots and leaves can be cooked and eaten. The young flowers are also edible, and the stems of older plants can be split to extract the edible raw pith. Additionally, the leaves can be used for tea.

Traditionally the young shoots are collected in the spring by Native American  and Siberian people and mixed with other greens. As the plant matures, the leaves become tough and somewhat bitter. Native Americans in the American southeast collect the stems in this stage. They are peeled and eaten raw. When properly prepared soon after picking they are a good source of vitamin C and provitamin A. The Denaʼina add fireweed to their dogs' food. Fireweed is also a medicine of the Upper Inlet Dena'ina, who treat pus-filled boils or cuts by placing a piece of the raw stem on the afflicted area. This is said to draw the pus out of the cut or boil and prevents a cut with pus in it from healing over too quickly.

The root can be roasted after scraping off the outside, but often tastes bitter. To mitigate this, the root is collected before the plant flowers and the brown thread in the middle removed. The stem centers can also be prepared by splitting the outer stalk, and eaten raw.

In Russia, fireweed (C. angustifolium) is made into a tea known as Ivan Chai or Koporsky tea (from the town of Koporye, where it has been produced since the 13th century). They use it as highly prized medicinal herb too. The popularity of fireweed tea perhaps stems from the similarity of its production to that of common black tea (Camellia sinensis), leading to a richly flavoured and deeply coloured herbal tea, with no caffeine, it is commercially sold in a blend with mint or thyme.

Fireweed tea is high in iron, copper, potassium and calcium. 

In the Yukon, the flowers from fireweed are made into jelly.

The honey produced from fireweed is highly valued for its quality. Most fireweed honey is produced in locations in cool climates, such as the Pacific Northwest in the United States and Scandinavian countries in Europe.

Fireweed's natural variation in ploidy has prompted its use in scientific studies of polyploidy's possible effects on adaptive potential and species diversification.

Because fireweed can colonize disturbed sites, even following an old oil spill, it is often used to reestablish vegetation.

It is also grown as an ornamental plant. A white form, C. angustifolium 'Album', is listed by the Royal Horticultural Society.

Land management 
Because of its rapid establishment on disturbed land, fireweed can be used for land management purposes. Events such as logging, fires and mass wasting can leave the land barren and without vegetation. This causes the land to be more susceptible to erosion because of the lack of root structure in the soil. Fireweed is a useful tool that can be utilized after prescribed fires and logging events because of its fire resistance and ability to recycle the nutrients left in the soil after a fire. It is also able to quickly establish a root system for reproduction and through this can prevent mass wasting and erosion events from occurring on burned or logged hillsides. Reestablishment of vegetation is crucial in the recovery time of disturbed lands. In many cases, fireweed establishes itself on these disturbed lands, but implementing the introduction of fireweed to a disturbed area as a management practice could prove useful in speeding up the recovery of disturbed lands. Disturbed and burned over lands are generally unpleasant to look at and pose a risk to habitats and nearby communities because of their susceptibility to mass wasting events. Fireweed can quickly establish itself across the landscape and prevent further damage, while providing a blanket of vegetation for recovering fauna to create new habitats in and for pollinators to foster the re-establishment of a diverse set of flora.

Culture

Fireweed is the floral emblem of Yukon.

Because of fireweed's poetic nature, it has found use in poetry and prose since at least the 19th century. Rudyard Kipling wrote, "The fire-weed glows in the centre of the drive ways". In The Fellowship of the Ring, J. R. R. Tolkien lists fireweed as one of the flowering plants returning to the site of a bonfire inside the Old Forest.

As the first plant to colonise waste ground, fireweed is often mentioned in postwar British literature. The children's novel Fireweed is set during the Blitz and features two runaway teenagers who meet on bomb sites where fireweed is growing profusely. Another children's novel, A Reflection of Rachel features a protagonist attempting to restore an old garden that used "Rose Pink Willow Herb" as an ornamental plant and mentions its notoriety for growing on abandoned bomb sites.  Cicely Mary Barker's  1948 book Flower Fairies of the Wayside included an illustration of 'The Rose-Bay Willow-Herb Fairy', with the accompanying verse "On the breeze my fluff is blown; So my airy seeds are sown. Where the earth is burnt and sad, I will come to make it glad. All forlorn and ruined places, All neglected empty spaces, I can cover—only think!— With a mass of rosy pink."

Rosebay Willowherb was subsequently voted the county flower of London in 2002 following a poll by the wild plant conservation charity Plantlife.

References

External links

Fire Effects Information System (FEIS) Syntheses about fire ecology and fire regimes in the United States
USDA Plants profile for Chamerion angustifolium (fireweed)
Calflora Database: Chamerion angustifolium (fireweed)
Jepson Manual eFlora treatment of Chamerion angustifolium

Washington Flora Checklist
NCBI: Chamerion angustifolium

Edible and Medicinal Plants of the West, Gregory L. Tilford, 
Northernbushcraft.com: Edibility of Fireweed – visual identification and edible parts

angustifolium
Edible plants
Flora of Europe
Flora of North America
Plants described in 1753
Taxa named by Carl Linnaeus
Medicinal plants of North America
Plants used in traditional Native American medicine